Arie Luijendijk (anglicised as Arie Luyendyk; born 21 September 1953), nicknamed "The Flying Dutchman," is a Dutch former auto racing driver, and winner of the 1990 and 1997 Indianapolis 500 races. He was inducted into the Indianapolis Motor Speedway Hall of Fame in 2009, and the Motorsports Hall of Fame of America in 2014. 

Luyendyk won a total of seven Indy car races, including three in the CART series, all of them on ovals.

Career

Luyendyk started racing in the early 1970s, winning a number of Dutch national titles. In 1977, he won the European Super Vee championship, and switched to Formula Three. Further success eluded him until he moved to the United States in 1984, where he immediately won the Super Vee championship.

With the help of sponsor Provimi Veal, Luyendyk ran his first full Champ Car season in 1985, winning the rookie of the year title both for the season and the Indianapolis 500. Gaining additional sponsorship from Domino's Pizza (and changing his racing number to 30, as at the time Domino's guaranteed customers that delivery orders would arrive in 30 minutes or less), his first win in the series came five years later in 1990, at the most important race in the series, with a record average speed of 185.981 mph (299.307 km/h). Luyendyk won the 1990 Indianapolis 500 for Doug Shierson Racing. His average speed record, which stood for 23 years, was finally broken in the 2013 97th Indianapolis 500 by Tony Kanaan with an average speed of 187.433 mph (301.644 km/h).

Luyendyk continued to perform well at Indianapolis, scoring pole positions in 1993, 1997 and 1999, and retiring from the race while leading on three occasions. In 1995, Luyendyk controlled the race early until an incident with Scott Sharp put him several laps down. For the rest of the race, Luyendyk was able to make up all his laps and barely beat eventual winner Jacques Villeneuve at the stripe to get his final lap back and finish on the lead lap.

In 1996, he set the qualifying lap record at 237.498 mph (382.216 km/h), although he did not start on the pole because he qualified on the second day of time trials. He won the 1997 Indianapolis 500 from the pole over Treadway Racing teammate Scott Goodyear. The race ended in controversy when on the final restart the white and green flag waved to end a caution but the yellow lights stayed on with Luyendyk pulling away to the win while the other competitors were confused. A similar finish involving a similar mistake almost took away a win from Luyendyk two weeks later.

At the 1997 True Value 500 at Texas, a scoring error by the USAC resulted in Billy Boat being declared the race winner. Luyendyk protested in front of victory lane, only to be slapped by Boat's team owner A. J. Foyt. Following the incident, Foyt and Luyendyk were fined 20,000 and 14,000 respectively, for unsportsmanlike behaviour. IndyCar officials reviewed the race tape and discovered that Luyendyk had actually finished on a lap by himself and completed more laps than the scheduled race distance, thus he was declared the official winner. Because Foyt refused to surrender the trophy, a duplicate was awarded to Luyendyk.

Luyendyk also was selected to participate in the 1992, 1993, and 1998 editions of the International Race of Champions.

After his terrific run in 1997, Luyendyk had a washout year the following season. He only won one race, and had several races where he didn't finish the full distance. After 1998, Luyendyk decided to cut down to a part-time schedule, only racing in the 1999 Indianapolis 500 where he won the pole and dropped out because of a crash. He retired from racing after the 1999 season, and for a short time, joined ABC Sports as a color commentator. He returned to the Indy 500 in 2001 and 2002. In 2003, he entered at Indianapolis for the final time. He suffered a crash during practice, and did not make an attempt to qualify.

Other Luyendyk victories include the 24 Hours of Daytona and the 12 Hours of Sebring. His son, Arie Jr., is an off-road and Indy Lights racer.

The last corner of the Zandvoort track in the Netherlands carries his name. In 1999, he was presented with the Sagamore of the Wabash award, reflecting upon his Indy 500 career. In 2016, Luyendyk was selected as a chief steward for the IndyCar Series alongside fellow racer Max Papis and Dan Davis.

Motorsports career results

Complete European F5000 Championship results
(key) (Races in bold indicate pole position; races in italics indicate fastest lap.)

Complete European Formula Two Championship results
(key) (Races in bold indicate pole position; races in italics indicate fastest lap)

American open-wheel racing
(key) (Races in bold indicate pole position; races in italics indicate fastest lap.)

Formula Super Vee

CART PPG World Series

IndyCar Series

 ''1 Luyendyk was listed as the primary entry and participated in practice; during practice, Luyendyk crashed, and decided to sit out the race due to injuries. Alex Barron replaced him in the car.

Indianapolis 500

24 Hours of Le Mans results

International Race of Champions
(key) (Bold – Pole position. * – Most laps led.)

References

External links 
 
 The Greatest 33

1953 births
Living people
Indianapolis 500 drivers
Indianapolis 500 polesitters
Indianapolis 500 Rookies of the Year
Indianapolis 500 winners
IndyCar Series drivers
Champ Car drivers
IndyCar Series team owners
International Race of Champions drivers
SCCA Formula Super Vee drivers
Formula Super Vee Champions
Dutch racing drivers
Dutch expatriate sportspeople in the United States
Motorsport announcers
People from Middelharnis
24 Hours of Le Mans drivers
24 Hours of Daytona drivers
Blancpain Endurance Series drivers
24 Hours of Spa drivers
12 Hours of Sebring drivers
Chip Ganassi Racing drivers
Sportspeople from South Holland
Formel Super Vau drivers
Mo Nunn Racing drivers
Bettenhausen Racing drivers
Nismo drivers
Josef Kaufmann Racing drivers
German Formula Three Championship drivers
United Autosports drivers
USAC Gold Crown champions